Ahmad Nordin Bin Alias (born 26 October 1985 in Terengganu) is a Malaysian footballer last played for Marcerra United F.C. in Malaysia FAM League. Nordin is Kuala Muda Naza former player. He captained Terengganu in 2015.

Ahmad Nordin appeared Terengganu FA hero team in the Malaysia FA Cup 2011 final tournament when it managed to score a 2-1 victory to Kelantan FA.

Nordin was born in Medan Jaya, Marang, Terengganu. He joined Terengganu in 2008.

Career statistics

Club

References

External links
 

1985 births
Living people
Malaysian footballers
Terengganu FC players
People from Terengganu
Malaysian people of Malay descent
Association football midfielders